Usquert is a railway station located in Usquert, Netherlands. The station was opened on 16 August 1893 and is located on the Sauwerd–Roodeschool railway. The train services are operated by Arriva.

Train service
The following services currently call at Usquert:
2x per hour local service (stoptrein) Groningen - Roodeschool

References

External links
 Usquert station, station information

Transport in Het Hogeland
Railway stations in Groningen (province)
Railway stations opened in 1893